Hohe Mark (Spessart) is a wooded hill of Bavaria, Germany. It is part of the Mittelgebirge Spessart and lies in the district of Aschaffenburg, near Alzenau.

External links

Hills of Bavaria
Aschaffenburg (district)
Hills of the Spessart